County Tyrone is a former UK Parliament constituency in Ireland, returning two Members of Parliament (MPs).

Boundaries
This constituency comprised the whole of County Tyrone, except the parliamentary borough of Dungannon.

It returned two MPs from 1801 to 1885. It was an original constituency represented in Parliament when the Union of Great Britain and Ireland was created on 1 January 1801.

In the redistribution, which took effect in 1885, County Tyrone was divided into four single-member constituencies: East Tyrone, Mid Tyrone, North Tyrone and South Tyrone.

Politics
The constituency electorate was predominantly Tory/Conservative during most of this period.

Catholics were excluded from taking seats in Parliament until 1829 and there was a restrictive property based franchise. It was not until the electoral reforms which took effect in 1885 that most adult males became voters. See Catholic emancipation for further details.

In these circumstances most MPs came from a limited number of Protestant aristocratic and gentry families. There were few contested elections.

It was only in 1880, at the end of the period when this constituency existed, that the Liberals first won a seat in the county.

Members of Parliament

Notes:
 Stooks Smith does not specify any party allegiances for this constituency before 1818. This does not necessarily mean that the MPs were not associated with a Party in Parliament.
 From 1832 Lowry-Corry and Stewart are classified as Conservatives.
 In 1847 Lowry-Corry and Hamilton contested the general election as Peelite Liberal Conservatives, but were again Conservatives by 1852.

Elections
The single-member elections in this constituency took place using the first past the post electoral system. Multi-member elections used the Plurality-at-large voting system.

There was no election in 1801. The representatives of the county in the former Parliament of Ireland became members of the 1st Parliament of the United Kingdom.

After 1832, when registration of voters was introduced, a turnout figure is given for contested elections. In two-member elections this is calculated by dividing the number of votes by two. To the extent that voters did not use both their votes this will be an underestimate of turnout. If the electorate figure is unknown the last known electorate figure is used to provide an estimate of turnout.

Where a party had more than one candidate in one or both of a pair of successive elections change is calculated for each individual candidate, otherwise change is based on the party vote.

Elections in the 1800s

 Corry succeeded as 2nd Earl Belmore

Elections in the 1810s

Elections in the 1820s

 Death of John Stewart

Elections in the 1830s

 Alexander succeeded as 3rd Earl of Caledon

Elections in the 1840s

 Appointment of Lowry Corry as Lord Commissioner of the Admiralty

Elections in the 1850s
 Appointment of Hamilton as Treasurer of the Household

 

 Appointment of Hamilton as Treasurer of the Household

Elections in the 1860s

 Appointment of Lowry-Corry as Vice-President of the Committee of the Council for Education

 Appointment of Hamilton as Vice-Chamberlain of the Household

 Appointment of Lowry-Corry as First Lord of the Admiralty

Elections in the 1870s
 Death of Lowry Corry

Elections in the 1880s

 Litton appointed Land Commissioner

References

Sources 
The Parliaments of England by Henry Stooks Smith (1st edition published in three volumes 1844–50), 2nd edition edited (in one volume) by F.W.S. Craig (Political Reference Publications 1973)

See also
 List of UK Parliamentary constituencies in Ireland and Northern Ireland

Westminster constituencies in County Tyrone (historic)
Constituencies of the Parliament of the United Kingdom established in 1801
Constituencies of the Parliament of the United Kingdom disestablished in 1885